The year 1996's Stones Bitter Super League I was the official name for the 102nd season of top-level rugby league football, and the first year of Europe's new championship: Super League. It is also the first season of rugby league to be played in summer. The competition featured all eleven teams from the 1995–96 Rugby Football League season plus one expansion club, Paris Saint-Germain.

Teams
Twelve teams were selected to play in the inaugural Super League season.

D*-League and Cup winners

Operational rules
Player numbering:
 The Rugby Football League Council approved a proposal by Super League chief executives to adopt squad numbering. Players would wear a number (1-25) on their shirts all season in addition to their names.

Rules to ensure the sustainability of Super League clubs were introduced:
 Clubs operated under a series of financial rules that specified spending levels in different areas of club operations, demanded that clubs' accounts be submitted monthly for monitoring.
 A salary cap restricted clubs from spending more than 40% of their income on players.

To protect global Super League interests:
 Due to the Super League war in Australia, a number of British players signed "loyalty" contracts which gave News Corporation a veto power over them in an attempt to prevent transfers to Australian Rugby League clubs.

Rule changes
Four new rules were introduced for the inaugural Super League season:
 Scrums were now to be set 20 metres from the touch-line, with the aim of creating attacking opportunities.
 At the restart after a try has been scored and the conversion attempt has been taken, the side that scored will now kick off to the other team. This change aimed to make contests more even by almost guaranteeing possession for the side that had conceded points. Greg McCallum, the director of referees' coaching, also noted that this convention was "in line with most other sports" and "that is significant when we come to promoting the game in America and Asia".

In an attempt to "clean up" the ruck:
 At the play-the-ball, the side not in possession was barred from striking for the ball.
 Also at the play-the-ball, the tackled player was stopped from being able to tap the ball forwards to himself - even in the absence of markers.

Championship
On 29 March 1996, Super League kicked off in Paris before 17,873 people at the Charlety Stadium when new team Paris Saint Germain overcame Sheffield Eagles 30-24. Jacques Fouroux, the PSG president, described that night, "Ninety eight per cent of them [the crowd] were new to the game, but they understood it right away. They saw tries, lots of commitment and lots of movement. They saw beauty. They attended a great party."

The reigning champions Wigan were hoping to maintain their hold on the championship in the newly formed Super League. However, at the end of the season St. Helens were crowned inaugural Super League champions after a win over Warrington Wolves at Knowsley Road, finishing in first position on the league ladder. During the year a secondary title, known as the Premiership was also played, with the final being contested between Wigan and the championship winners St. Helens with Wigan coming out victorious and Andy Farrell winning the Harry Sunderland Trophy.

Workington Town finished bottom for the second successive season and thus relegated to the first division. To date this is their only Super League season and no other club from Cumbria has competed since, Salford Reds were promoted to take their place in Super League II.

League table

Premiership

The top four finishing teams competed in a short play-off series for the Premiership Trophy. This competition was separate to the Super League Championship awarded to St. Helens, and continued a long tradition in British rugby league of crowning a season champion and an end of season Premier. The final was played between the Wigan and St. Helens on Sunday, 8 September at Old Trafford before a crowd of 35,013. Wigan won the match 44-14 and their loose forward Andy Farrell received the Harry Sunderland Trophy as man-of-the-match.

Statistics
The following are the top points scorers in the Super League during the 1996 season. Statistics are for league matches only.

Most tries

Most goals

Most points

See also
Super League war
1996 Challenge Cup

References

External links
Super League Official website
Super League I at rlhalloffame.org.uk
Super League I at wigan.rlfans.com
Super League I at rugbyleagueproject.com

 
1996 in English rugby league
1996 in French rugby league